Acleris expressa is a species of moth of the family Tortricidae. It is found in South Korea, China, Russia (Amur) and Japan.

The wingspan is 19–22 mm.

The larvae feed on Fraxinus mandshurica.

References

Moths described in 1931
expressa
Moths of Asia